Jim Dale  (born James Smith; 15 August 1935) is an English actor, composer, director, narrator, singer and songwriter. In the United Kingdom he is known as a pop singer of the 1950s who became a leading actor at the National Theatre. In British film, he became one of the regulars in the Carry On films, along with Leslie Phillips, Valerie Leon, Kenneth Cope, Julian Holloway, Hugh Futcher, Anita Harris, Amanda Barrie, Jacki Piper,  Angela Douglas and Patricia Franklin. 

In the United States he is most recognised as a leading actor on Broadway, where he had roles in Scapino, Barnum, Candide and Me and My Girl, as well as for narrating all seven of the Harry Potter audiobooks in the American market (for which he received two Grammy Awards out of six nominations) and the ABC series Pushing Daisies (2007–2009); he also starred in the Disney film Pete's Dragon (1977). He was nominated for a BAFTA Award for portraying a young Spike Milligan in Adolf Hitler: My Part in His Downfall (1973).

As a lyricist, Dale was nominated for both an Academy Award and Golden Globe Award for the song "Georgy Girl", the theme for the 1966 film of the same title.

Early life
Dale was born James Smith, to William Henry and Miriam Jean (née Wells) Smith in Rothwell, Northamptonshire. He was educated at Kettering Grammar School. He trained as a dancer for six years before his debut as a stage comic in 1951. He completed two years of national service in the Royal Air Force.

Career

Music
At the age of 22, Dale became the first pop singer to work with Parlophone head George Martin. He achieved four hits on the UK Singles Chart; "Be My Girl" (1957, UK No. 2), "Just Born (To Be Your Baby)" (1958, UK No. 27), "Crazy Dream" (1958, UK No. 24), and "Sugartime" (1958, UK No. 25). Dale recorded an album with Martin, Jim! (1958), and appeared contemporaneously as a presenter and performer on BBC Television's Six-Five Special, but he was vocal about comedy aspirations and his career as a teen idol was ultimately short-lived.

As a songwriter, Dale is best remembered as the lyricist for the film theme "Georgy Girl", for which he was nominated for the Academy Award for Best Original Song and the Golden Globe Award for Best Original Song in 1966. The song (performed by the Seekers) reached number 2 in the US Billboard Hot 100 chart the following year, it also made number 3 in Dale's native UK and Number 1 in Australia, going on to sell over 11 million records around the world. He also wrote lyrics for the title songs of the films The Winter's Tale, Shalako, Twinky (Lola in the United States) and Joseph Andrews. He also wrote and recorded the song "Dick-a-Dum-Dum (King's Road)", which became a hit for Des O'Connor in 1969.

Film
Dale's film debut was in Break-In (1956), a War Office  information film. He next appeared in Six Five Special (1958), a spin-off from the BBC TV series of the same title. This film was also released under the name Calling All Cats. He then had a tiny role in the comedy Raising the Wind (1961) as a trombone player who thwarts orchestral conductor Kenneth Williams. However, he is best known in Britain for his appearances in eleven Carry On films, a long-running series of comedy farces, generally playing the hapless romantic lead. His Carry On career began in small roles: first as an expectant father in Carry On Cabby (1963), which was followed by Carry On Jack (1964). From Carry On Spying (1964) onwards, his roles were more substantial. Following Carry On Cleo (1964), his first principal role was Carry On Cowboy (1965), set in the Wild West, where he played an immigrant English sanitary engineer called Marshall P. Knutt who is mistakenly hired as a police marshal. Then came Carry On Screaming! (1966), Don't Lose Your Head (1966), Follow That Camel (1967), Carry On Doctor (1967), Carry On Again Doctor (1969) and the 1992 revival Carry On Columbus.

Dale played Harold, the policeman in the 1965 comedy film The Big Job with two of his regular Carry On co-stars, Sidney James and Joan Sims. 

In 1973, he appeared in the role of Spike Milligan in Adolf Hitler: My Part in His Downfall, the film adaptation of the first volume of Spike Milligan's autobiography. It starred Dale as the young Terence "Spike" Milligan, while Milligan himself plays the part of his father, Leo. Dale was nominated for the BAFTA Award for Most Promising Newcomer to Leading Film Roles for his performance.

He played Dr. Terminus in Walt Disney's Pete's Dragon (1977). In the 1978 Walt Disney comedy film Hot Lead and Cold Feet he played three characters, including both lead male parts, whilst 1973 saw him co-star in The National Health.

Stage
At the age of 17, Dale became one of the youngest professional comedians in Britain, touring all the variety music halls.

In 1970 Sir Laurence Olivier invited Dale to join the National Theatre Company in London, then based at the Old Vic. At the Young Vic Theatre, he created the title role in Scapino (ca. 1970), which he co-adapted with Frank Dunlop, and played Petruchio in The Taming of the Shrew.

His other UK credits include The Card (1973), and The Wayward Way in London. He appeared in The Winter's Tale as Autolycus and A Midsummer Night's Dream as Bottom at the Edinburgh Festivals in 1966 and 1967 for Frank Dunlop's Pop Theatre. He took over the part of Fagin in Cameron Mackintosh's Oliver! at the London Palladium in September 1995.

For his Broadway performances, Dale has been nominated for five Tony Awards, winning one for Barnum (1980) for which the New York Times described him as "The Toast of Broadway", also winning the second of five Drama Desk Awards, and the second of five Outer Critics Awards. Other work includes Scapino (1974) (Drama Desk Award, Outer Critics Award, Tony Award Nomination), A Day in the Death of Joe Egg (1985) (Outer Critics Award, Tony Award Nomination), Me and My Girl (1986) Candide (1997) (Tony Award Nomination) and The Threepenny Opera (2006) for the Roundabout Theatre Company. Dale played Mister Peacham and won a Drama Desk Award, Outer Critics' Award, The Richard Seff Award and a Tony Award nomination.

Credits Off-Broadway include Travels with My Aunt (1995) (Drama Desk Award, Lucille Lortel Award, Outer Critics Award), Privates On Parade (1989), Comedians (2003) (Drama Desk Award nomination and a Lucille Lortel Award nomination) and Address Unknown (2004).

Dale's other stage work includes The Taming of the Shrew as Petruchio with the Young Vic, London (1970) and the Brooklyn Academy of Music, New York (1974); The Music Man U.S. tour (1984), and The Invisible Man at the Cleveland Play House (1998). He played the part of Ebenezer Scrooge in A Christmas Carol: The Musical at the Theater at Madison Square Garden, New York City, from 28 November to 27 December 2003.

In November 2006 Dale starred as Charlie Baxter in a one-night only concert version of the Sherman brothers musical, Busker Alley alongside Glenn Close. This was a benefit for the York Theatre Company, and was held at Hunter College in New York City. He wrote and appeared in his one-man show, Just Jim Dale, looking back over nearly sixty years in show business. It opened on 15 May 2014 at the Roundabout Theatre Company Laura Pels Theatre, winning Dale his fifth Outer Critics Circle Award, and his fifth Drama Desk Award. It opened at the Vaudeville Theatre in the West End in May 2015.

Television
Source: The New York Times

 Six-Five Special (1957) – BBC (Host)
 Thank Your Lucky Stars (1965–66) – ITV (Host)
 Join Jim Dale (1969) – ITV (Host)
 Sunday Night at the London Palladium (1973) – (Host)
 Cinderella (Host) Ballet (1981)
 Adventures of Huckleberry Finn (1986) – American Playhouse for PBS
 The American Clock (1993) – by Arthur Miller
 The Bill Cosby Show (1998)
 The Ellen Burstyn Show
 The Dinah Shore Show
 Meet Jim Dale – ATV London
 The Jim Dale Show – ATV London
 The Equalizer – Episode – Mama's Boy – as Gilbert

Dale opened every episode of the ABC drama Pushing Daisies (2009) as the unseen narrator.

Voice work
In the United States, Jim Dale is known as the voice of the Harry Potter audiobooks. He has recorded all seven books in the Harry Potter series as audiobooks, and as a narrator he has won two Grammy Awards (in 2001 and 2008) and received seven Grammy nominations and a record ten Audie Awards including "Audio Book of the Year 2004" for Harry Potter and the Order of the Phoenix, "Best Children's Narrator 2001/2005/2007/2008," "Best Children's Audio Book 2005," two Benjamin Franklin Awards from the Independent Book Publishers Association (one of these was in 2001 for Harry Potter and the Prisoner of Azkaban) and 23 AudioFile Earphone Awards.

He narrates the Harry Potter video games and many of the interactive "extras" on the Harry Potter DVD releases. He also holds one current and two former Guinness World Records. He holds one current record for occupying the first six places in the Top Ten Audio Books of America and Canada 2005. Previously, he held records for creating the most character voices for an audiobook (134 for Harry Potter and the Order of the Phoenix in 2003, followed by 146 voices for Harry Potter and the Deathly Hallows in 2007), though the record was later awarded to Roy Dotrice for his 2004 recording of A Game of Thrones. Dale opened every episode of the ABC drama Pushing Daisies as the unseen narrator.

In the mid-1960s, Dale presented Children's Favourites on BBC Radio for a year.

He narrated the Peter and the Starcatchers (2004) audio book, and its three sequels. In 2018, Dale narrated SPIN: The Rumpelstiltskin Musical by Edelman and Fishman, noted as being the first audiobook musical of its kind. SPIN was released by Harper Audio on 9 January 2018. The following year, Dale narrated Puss In Boots a Musical by Edelman and Fishman, adapted for the audiobook by Edelman, Fishman, and Khristine Hvam. It was released by Harper Audio on 27 August 2019.

Honours 
In 2003, Dale was awarded the MBE, as part of the Queen's Birthday Honours List, for his work in promoting children's English literature.

Selected filmography
Source: The New York Times
 Break-In (1956) as Private Berry
 Six Five Special (1958) as Presenter
 Raising the Wind (1961) as Violinist
 The Iron Maiden (1962) as Bill
 Nurse on Wheels (1963) as Tim Taylor
 Carry On Cabby (1963) as Expectant Father
 Carry On Jack (1964) as Carrier
 Carry On Spying (1964) as Carstairs
 Carry On Cleo (1964) as Horsa
 The Big Job (1965) as Harold
 Carry On Cowboy (1965) as Marshall P. Knutt
 Carry On Screaming! (1966) as Albert Potter
 Don't Lose Your Head (1967) as Lord Darcy de Pue
 Follow That Camel (1967) as Bertram Oliphant (BO) West
 Carry On Doctor (1967) as Dr. Jim Kilmore
 The Plank (1967) as Painter
 Lock Up Your Daughters (1969) as Lusty
 Carry On Again Doctor (1969) as Dr. Jimmy Nookey
 Digby, the Biggest Dog in the World (1973) as Jeff Eldon
 The National Health (1973) as Barnet/ Dr. Boyd
 Adolf Hitler: My Part in His Downfall (1973) as Terence "Spike" Milligan
 Pete's Dragon (1977) as Dr. Terminus
 Joseph Andrews (1977) as Pedlar
 Hot Lead and Cold Feet (1978) as Jasper Bloodshy/Wild Billy Bloodshy/Eli Bloodshy
 Unidentified Flying Oddball (1979) as Sir Mordred
 Scandalous (1984) as Inspector Anthony Crisp
 Carry On Columbus (1992) as Christopher Columbus
 The Hunchback (1997) as Cloplin

Awards and nominations
Sources: allmusic.com; Playbillvault; Audio Publisher

Awards
 1966 International Laurel Award  –  Best Song  –  Georgy Girl
 1974 Drama Desk Award  –  Outstanding Performance  – Scapino 
 1974 Outer Critics Circle Award  –  Outstanding Actor  –  Scapino
 1980 Drama Desk Award  –  Outstanding Actor in a Musical  –  Barnum
 1980 Tony Award  –  Best Actor in a Musical  –  Barnum
 1984 Outer Critics Circle Award  –  Outstanding Actor  –  Joe Egg
 1995 Drama Desk Award  –   Unique Theatrical Ensemble Experience  –  Travels with My Aunt
 1995 Outer Critics Circle Award  –  Outstanding Actor  –  Travels with My Aunt
 2001 Grammy Award  –  Best Spoken Word Album for Children  –  Harry Potter and the Goblet of Fire
 2001 Audie Award  –  Best Male Narrator  –  Harry Potter and the Goblet of Fire
 2004 Audie Award  –  Audiobook of the Year  –  Harry Potter and the Order of the Phoenix
 2004 Audie Award  –  Children's Title  –  Harry Potter and the Order of the Phoenix
 2005 Audie Award  –  Classics  –  A Christmas Carol
 2005 Audie Award  –  Best Male Narrator  –  Peter and the Star Catchers
 2005 Audie Award  –  Children's Title  –  Peter and the Starcatchers
 2006 Thespian Award  –  Friars Club, New York.
 2006 Drama Desk Award  –  Outstanding Featured Actor in a Musical  –  The Threepenny Opera
 2006 Outer Critics Circle Award  –  Outstanding Actor  –  The Threepenny Opera
 2006 The Richard Seff Award  –  The Threepenny Opera
 2006 The Order of St. George's Society, New York
 2006 Audie Award  –  Classics  –  Around the World in Eighty Days
 2006 Audie Award  –  Hall of Fame - Harry Potter series
 2007 Audie Award  –  Best Male Narrator – Peter and the Shadow Thieves
 2008 Audie Award  –  Best Male Narrator – Harry Potter and the Deathly Hallows
 2008 Grammy Award  –  Best Spoken Word Album for Children – Harry Potter and the Deathly Hallows
 2009 Audie Award  –  Young Listeners' Title – James Herriot's Treasury For Children
 Twenty-three Audiofile Headphone Awards
 2009 – Inducted into the American Theater Hall of Fame.
 2018 – Urban Stages' 2017 Lifetime Achievement Award
 2019 Audie Award  –  Original Work – SPIN: The Rumpelstiltskin Musical
 2019 SOVAS Awards - Audiobook Narration (Infant to 12) - Puss in Boots: A Musical

Nominations
 1967 Academy Award  –  Best Music, Original Song – Georgy Girl (shared with Tom Springfield for the song "Georgy Girl")
 1967 Golden Globe Award  –  Best Music, Original Song – Georgy Girl (shared with Tom Springfield for the song "Georgy Girl")
 1974 BAFTA Academy Award  –  Most Promising Newcomer to Leading Film Roles – Adolf Hitler: My Part in His Downfall
 1975 Tony Award  –  Best Actor in Play – Scapino
 1985 Drama Desk Award  –  Outstanding Actor in a Play – Joe Egg
 1985 Tony Award  –  Best Actor in Play – Joe Egg
 1997 Drama Desk Award  –  Outstanding Actor in a Musical – Candide
 1997 Tony Award  –  Best Actor in a Musical – Candide
 2000 Audie Award  – Children's Title  –  Harry Potter and the Half Blood Prince
 2001 Audie Award  –  Audie Award for Children's Title for Ages Eight and Up  –  Harry Potter and the Goblet of Fire
 2003 Drama Desk Award  –  Outstanding Actor in a Play – Comedians
 2006 Tony Award  –  Best Featured Actor in a Musical – The Threepenny Opera
 2006 Audie Award  –  Audiobook of the Year  –  Harry Potter and the Half Blood Prince
 2006 Audie Award  – Audie Award for Children's Title for Ages Eight and Up  –  Harry Potter and the Half Blood Prince
 2008 Audie Award  –  Audiobook of the Year – Harry Potter and the Deathly Hallows
 2009 Audie Award  –  Young Listeners' Title – The Shoe Bird
 2018 Audie Award  –  Young Listeners' Title – A Sick Day for Amos McGee
 2020 Audie Award  –  Audio Drama – Puss in Boots: The Musical

References

External links

Jim Dale at Carry On Online
Jim Dale at Aveleyman
 

1935 births
Living people
20th-century English male actors
21st-century English male actors
Actors from Northamptonshire
Audiobook narrators
British expatriate male actors in the United States  
British male comedy actors
Drama Desk Award winners
English expatriates in the United States
English male film actors
English male musical theatre actors
English male singer-songwriters
English male stage actors
English male television actors
English male voice actors
Grammy Award winners
Members of the Order of the British Empire
People from Rothwell, Northamptonshire
Tony Award winners
Members of The Lambs Club
Royal Air Force airmen